Sclerodarnavirus is a genus of viruses in the order Tymovirales, in the family Alphaflexiviridae. Fungi serve as natural hosts. There is only one species in this genus: Sclerotinia sclerotiorum debilitation-associated RNA virus. Diseases associated with this genus include: hypovirulence or debilitation.

Structure
Genomes are linear, around 5.5kb in length.

Life cycle
Viral replication is cytoplasmic. Entry into the host cell is achieved by penetration into the host cell. Replication follows the positive stranded RNA virus replication model. Positive stranded RNA virus transcription is the method of transcription. The virus exits the host cell by tripartite non-tubule guided viral movement. Fungi serve as the natural host.

References

External links
 Viralzone: Sclerodarnavirus
 ICTV

Alphaflexiviridae
Virus genera